The 1980–81 international cricket season was from September 1980 to April 1981.

Season overview

November

West Indies in Pakistan

1980–81 Benson & Hedges World Series

New Zealand in Australia

January

India in Australia

February

England in the West Indies

India in New Zealand

References

International cricket competitions by season
1980 in cricket
1981 in cricket